Like a Lover is an album by Canadian jazz singer Emilie-Claire Barlow. It was released  by her label, Empress Music Group, in 2005.

Track listing

Personnel
 Emilie-Claire Barlow – vocal, piano, percussion
 Guido Basso – flugelhorn
 John Johnson – tenor saxophone (on track 5)
 Kelly Jefferson – tenor saxophone (on tracks 2 & 7)
 Daniel LeBlanc – keyboards (on track 11)
 Justin Abedin – guitar (on track 11)
 Rob Piltch – guitar
 Marc Rogers – bass guitar
 Mark Kelso – drums

References

2005 albums
Emilie-Claire Barlow albums